Mahogany Run is a stream in the U.S. state of West Virginia.

Mahogany Run The community was named after the mahogany (or mahogany-like) timber along its course.

See also
List of rivers of West Virginia

References

Rivers of Monongalia County, West Virginia
Rivers of West Virginia